Niles is a city in southern Trumbull County, Ohio, United States, situated at the confluence of the Mahoning River and Mosquito Creek. The city's population was 18,443 at the 2020 census. It is a suburb of the Youngstown–Warren metropolitan area. 

Located in the nation's former industrial belt, the city's economy focused initially on iron manufacturing but later diversified to include steel and glass production. After the decline of the manufacturing sector throughout the northern United States in the 1970s, Niles has adapted to become a retail hub for the northern Mahoning Valley, with development centered around the Eastwood Mall complex and along the U.S. Route 422 corridor. The Mahoning Valley Scrappers, an MLB Draft League affiliate, play at Eastwood Field in Niles.

History
Niles was founded in 1806 by James Heaton, who owned one of the first iron-ore processing plants in Ohio. The town originally went by the name of Heaton's Furnace but was later renamed Nilestown, after Hezekiah Niles (editor of the Niles Register, a Baltimore newspaper). In 1843, the name was shortened to Niles. In the early 19th century, Heaton built a forge and, later, a charcoal blast furnace in the area just east of what is now the city's central park, on the west side of Mosquito Creek. Heaton is credited with producing the first bar iron in Ohio.

Niles' iron industry thrived until the late 19th century, when the economic depression of 1873 brought about the closure of the community's largest industrial firm, James Ward and Company. Plans to restore the local iron industry floundered because of the exorbitant cost of modernizing outdated mills. By the early 1900s, however, Niles was the site of companies including Ohio Galvanizing, Sykes Metal, the Niles Glass Works of the General Electric Company, and the Niles Iron and Steel Roofing Company. Between 1900 and 1920, the city's population swelled from 7,468 to slightly over 13,000. The community's efforts to rebuild its industry suffered a temporary setback in the 1910s. Niles was one of many cities affected by statewide floods that struck in the spring of 1913. On Easter Sunday, March 23, 1913, heavy rain throughout Ohio, combined with ice and snow that was still on the ground, precipitated massive flooding. Flooding of the Mahoning River left extensive damage and numerous casualties in Niles. Damage exceeded $3 million, and 428 people were confirmed dead.

At the beginning of the 20th century, Niles was a sundown town, with "a sign near the Erie depot…warn[ing] 'niggers' that they had better not 'let the sun set on their heads.'"

Throughout much of the late 19th and 20th century, Niles was known to most Ohioans as the birthplace of William McKinley, the 25th President of the United States. McKinley was born in Niles on January 29, 1843. He attended Niles High School (and the city's high school would eventually be renamed Niles McKinley High School, though McKinley eventually graduated from high school in Poland, Ohio).  President McKinley's assassination in 1901 shocked the nation and particularly saddened residents of northeastern Ohio.  In 1915, Youngstown industrialist Joseph G. Butler, Jr., a childhood friend of President McKinley, campaigned for the construction of the National McKinley Birthplace Memorial in downtown Niles. The facility currently houses the community's library as well as a small museum.

Niles' location in the Mahoning Valley, a center of steel production, ensured that the community would become a destination for immigrants from Southern and Eastern Europe in the early 20th century.  Dramatic demographic change fueled ethnic and religious tension throughout the northern United States following World War I, and Niles proved to be no exception to this trend. In the 1920s, regional chapters of the Ku Klux Klan targeted Niles because of its large Catholic population. The Klan marched through the center of Niles in May 1924, and attempted another march in June of the same year. When violence forced the Klan to cancel the second march, the event was rescheduled for November 1, 1924. The local mayor's ultimate decision to issue the Klan a permit for the march outraged many of the community's Italian- and Irish-American residents.

In response to the scheduled Klan march, an anti-Klan organization, the Knights of the Flaming Circle, pledged to hold their own parade of 10,000 participants on the same day. On October 29, the mayor's house was bombed, due to his refusal to revoke the permit. Tensions escalated from this point on, and the city gained national attention due to the impending marches. Despite the city's pleas for assistance from the militia, they were denied. The result was 18 hours of full-blown rioting. Control was brought to the town, requiring 10 days of martial law. Between the Klan and anti-Klan participants, 104 people were indicted.

Niles' economy was undermined in the 1970s, when the Mahoning Valley's steel industry – already in decline – collapsed.  Amid the economic challenges that followed, the community faced another natural catastrophe, with the catastrophe being an F5 tornado.

1985 tornado 

On May 31, 1985, the city of Niles was struck by an F5 tornado that had its origins just west of Newton Falls, where it destroyed much of that town. The tornado then moved through Lordstown and Warren, before wreaking havoc on Niles, where it flattened a roller skating rink and shopping mall. The tornado also leveled dozens of houses, ripped through the city's historic Union Cemetery, injured many people, and took several lives. As it progressed toward Pennsylvania, the tornado never left the ground. In the Niles area alone, nine people were killed, and 250 were injured. Nearly 70 homes were leveled and another 65 to 70 were severely damaged. In the Mahoning and Shenango valleys a total of 25 people died and 500 people were injured, and there was $140 million in property damage. A large figure of a gorilla (an advertising tool for a now-defunct ceramic store) is all that remained standing in one district affected by the tornado. The tornado of 1985 took a path through Niles that was almost identical to that of a tornado that struck in 1947.

Geography

Demographics

Niles is known for its ethnic diversity, and the community hosts a large Italian-American community.  The local center of Italian-American culture and tradition is Our Lady of Mount Carmel Catholic Church. The church's annual celebration of the feast day of Our Lady of Mount Carmel during July is considered one of Ohio's noteworthy Italian-American festivals.

2010 census
As of the census of 2010, there were 19,266 people, 8,499 households, and 4,971 families living in the city. The racial makeup of the city was 93.1% White, 3.5% African American, 0.2% Native American, 0.7% Asian, 0.3% from other races, and 2.2% from two or more races. Hispanic or Latino of any race were 1.3% of the population.

There were 8,499 households, of which 26.1% had children under the age of 18 living with them, 38.0% were married couples living together, 14.8% had a female householder with no husband present, 5.7% had a male householder with no wife present, and 41.5% were non-families. 35.6% of all households were made up of individuals, and 14.2% had someone living alone who was 65 years of age or older. The average household size was 2.24 and the average family size was 2.88.

The median age in the city was 42 years. 20.7% of residents were under the age of 18; 8.5% were between the ages of 18 and 24; 24.4% were from 25 to 44; 28.4% were from 45 to 64; and 17.8% were 65 years of age or older. The gender makeup of the city was 47.6% male and 52.4% female.

2000 census
As of the census of 2000, there were 20,932 people, 8,859 households, and 5,519 families living in the city. The population density was 2,447.5 people per square mile (945.3/km). There were 12,512 housing units at an average density of 1,112.7 per square mile (429.7/km). The racial makeup of the city was 95.98% White, 2.27% African American, 0.19% Native American, 0.33% Asian, 0.01% Pacific Islander, 0.22% from other races, and 1.00% from two or more races. Hispanic or Latino of any race were 0.83% of the population.

There were 5,012 households, out of which 26.7% had children under the age of 18 living with them, 45.1% were married couples living together, 13.3% had a female householder with no husband present, and 37.7% were non-families. 32.9% of all households were made up of individuals, and 13.1% had someone living alone who was 65 years of age or older. The average household size was 2.31 and the average family size was 2.95.

In the city, the age distribution of the population shows 22.3% under the age of 18, 8.1% from 18 to 24, 28.0% from 25 to 44, 23.8% from 45 to 64, and 17.9% who were 65 years of age or older. The median age was 40 years. For every 100 females, there were 89.4 males. For every 100 females age 18 and over, there were 85.3 males.

The median income for a household in the city was $65,615, and the median income for a family was $76,704.  Males had a median income of $35,936 versus $23,888 for females. The per capita income for the city was $19,410. About 6.5% of families and 9.6% of the population were below the poverty line, including 14.2% of those under age 18 and 5.0% of those age 65 or over.

Education
Children in Niles are served by the Niles City School District. The current schools serving Niles are:
 Niles Primary School – grades K-2
 Niles Intermediate School – grades 3-5
 Niles Middle School – grades 6-8
 Niles McKinley High School – grades 9-12

Culture

Attractions
 Eastwood Field, home of the MLB Draft League affiliate Mahoning Valley Scrappers.
 The National McKinley Birthplace Memorial Library and Museum in downtown Niles, established in 1915 to remember William McKinley.
 The Ward-Thomas Museum, the current home of the Niles Historical Society.

Sports

The Mahoning Valley Scrappers, a short-season Class A minor league baseball team, moved from Erie, Pennsylvania, to Niles in 1999. The team plays at Eastwood Field, located behind the Eastwood Mall on U.S. Highway 422.

Youngstown-based boxer Kelly Pavlik fought a nationally broadcast fight in Niles on July 1, 2003, against Rico Cason. The fight was broadcast over ESPN's "Tuesday Night Fights", and Pavlik won the fight by knockout in the second round.

Between 1980 and 1982, Youngstown-born boxer Harry Arroyo fought four of his professional fights in Niles, Ohio, and won all four of them, bringing his professional record at the time to 16–0. Eventually, Arroyo would win the IBF World Lightweight Title.

Notable people
 Joseph Bangust, World War II naval hero; received the Navy Cross in 1941, born in Niles
 Cynthia S. Burnett (1840–1932) educator, lecturer, temperance reformer, newspaper editor; born in Niles
 George Burns, major league baseball player, 1926 American League MVP
 Jim Capuzzi, professional football player; defensive back and quarterback for the Green Bay Packers, born in Niles
 John Hlay, professional football player; running back, fullback and linebacker for Ohio State University in 1950s; born in Niles
 Sonny Horne, professional boxer; fought Rocky Graziano, Pete Mead, Kid Gavilán, and others; born in Niles
Staughton Lynd, Marxist-Quaker activist historian and lawyer, resided in Niles
 William McKinley, 25th President of the United States, born in Niles
 A. F. Moritz, poet, born in Niles
 Kenneth Patchen, poet and noted figure of the Beat era, born in Niles
 Gertrude L. Pew, painter, born in Niles
 Phil Ragazzo, professional football player.
 Bo Rein, former Ohio State University football and baseball player, football coach at North Carolina State University and Louisiana State University; born and raised in Niles. The Bo Rein Stadium is named for him.
 Tim Ryan,  U.S. Representative for the 13th district of Ohio, born in and current resident of Niles
 Dominic Sena, film and music video director
 David Sherman, author, born in Niles
 Harry Mosley Stevens, inventor of the hotdog; there is a park in the city named after him
 W. Aubrey Thomas, 19th century U.S. Representative and industrialist; resided in Niles

References

External links
 City website

 
Cities in Ohio
Cities in Trumbull County, Ohio
Populated places established in 1806
Italian-American culture in Ohio
1806 establishments in Ohio
Sundown towns in Ohio